When an individual been made bankrupt in the UK it's legal and advisable to have a make use of an IVA referred to as a "fast-track individual voluntary arrangement" which implies the bankruptcy order can be annulled if all the terms have been fulfilled. It is necessary to put forward a payment proposal to the creditors that allows them to be paid more than they would under the standard bankruptcy order. The official receiver runs the FTVA for the individual if they agree with the proposal. The fast-track individual voluntary arrangement is cheaper than an ordinary IVA as there are set fees and costs.

FTVA In the UK
A fast-track voluntary arrangement (FTVA), in the United Kingdom, is a binding agreement with a debtors creditors to pay all or part of the money owed to them. A debtor can only enter into it after they have been made bankrupt. In an FTVA an official receiver acts as nominee; that is, he (or she) helps to prepare a proposal that is put to creditors and, if they accept the proposal, acts as supervisor, looking after the arrangement and making payments to creditors in accordance with the proposal.

Official receiver's fees
The official receiver's fee to act as nominee is currently £300, and as supervisor he also charges 15% of all sums realised. In addition, a registration fee of £35 for the FTVA is payable in order that the FTVA is recorded on the public register of all individual voluntary arrangements.

See also
 Insolvency Act 1986

External links
 Insolvency Practitioners Association website

Bankruptcy in the United Kingdom
Law of the United Kingdom
Insolvency law of the United Kingdom